Kubanstroy is a rural locality (a settlement) in Afipsipskoye Rural Settlement of Takhtamukaysky District, the Republic of Adygea, Russia. The population was 401 as of 2018. There are 3 streets.

Geography 
Kubanstroy is located 29 km northwest of Takhtamukay (the district's administrative centre) by road. Afipsip is the nearest rural locality.

References 

Rural localities in Takhtamukaysky District